Stalk the Wild Child is a fact based 1976 American television film directed by William Hale and starring David Janssen.

Plot
A psychologist attempts to civilize a child found in the forest.

Cast
David Janssen as Dr. James Hazard
Trish Van Devere as Maggie
Ben Bottoms as Young Cal
Joseph Bottoms as Adult Cal
Allan Arbus as Gault
Jamie-Smith Jackson as Andrea
Rhea Perlman as Jean
Fran Ryan as Ellen Mott
Barry Van Dyke as Volleyball Player

References

1976 television films
1976 films
Films directed by William Hale (director)